Amanishakheto was a Kandake of Kush. She seems to have reigned from 10 BC to 1 AD, although most dates of Kushite history before the Middle Ages are very uncertain.

In Meroitic hieroglyphs her name is written "Amanikasheto" (Mniskhte or (Am)niskhete). In Meroitic cursive she is referred to as Amaniskheto qor kd(ke) which means Amanishakheto, Qore and Kandake ("Ruler and Queen").

Monuments
Amanishakheto is known from several monuments. She is mentioned in the Amun-temple of Kawa, on a stela from Meroe, and in inscriptions of a palace building found at Wad ban Naqa, from a stela found at Qasr Ibrim, another stela from Naqa and her pyramid at Meroe (Beg. no. N6).

Amanishakheto is best known for a collection of jewelry stolen from her pyramid in 1834 by Italian treasure hunter Giuseppe Ferlini, who destroyed the pyramid in search of its burial goods. It was a treasure that fulfilled all his expectations: it consisted of 10 bracelets, 9 shield rings, 67 signet rings, 2 bracelets and a large number of amulets, all created by the best craftsmen of the Kingdom of Meroë These pieces are now in the Egyptian Museum of Berlin and in the Egyptian Museum of Munich.

Sandstone Relief 
A sandstone relief depicting the queen, now at the Khartoum National Museum in Sudan, was found in the Temple of Amun in Naqa. The relief depicts Queen Amanishakheto next to two deities. In Egyptian art, people depicted seated are of highest importance followed by whoever is facing towards the right. It is also important to note the hierarchy of scale. In this depiction, Amanishakheto is taller than the two figures however, the god that is seated would be taller than the two women. The deities have been identified as Amesemi and Apedemak, the warrior god and goddess. Amanishakheto is also seen wearing the royal costume that is associated with the Nubian warrior and hunting gods which further highlights her importance as a protector of her kingdom. The depiction of the queen with the two gods further emphasizes her power and status.

Stele of Queen Amanishakheto and the goddess Amesemi 
The stele on the left is another representation of Amanishakheto accompanied by the warrior goddess, Amesemi. This stele is made from sandstone and was found in the Temple of Amun in Naqa. The two women are depicted wearing similar garments: fitted clothing, a scarf with a tassel, a collar, and rounded wigs. Their bodies are represented in different ways however, the goddess has a slimmer figure with a dress that features more elaborate details. Amanishakheto is depicted in a more curvaceous way. The interaction between the two seems to be intimate which also speaks to the power Queen Amanishakheto had. The hieroglyphs in the back of the stele identify both women.   This stele was placed in the Temple of Amun in Naqa, which was built after the death of Queen Amanishakheto.

Gallery

References

Further reading
Laszlo Török, in: Fontes Historiae Nubiorum Vol. II, p. 723–725 (Bergen, 1996). 
Török László, “The Kingdom of Kush: Handbook of the Napatan-Meroitic Civilization,” in The Kingdom of Kush: Handbook of the Napatan-Meroitic Civilization (New York: Brill, 1998), pp. 456.
Vela-Rodrigo, Alberto A., in: The sacred treasure of Queen Amanishakheto, Ancient Egypt Magazine, 21(5), 2021, 44-50.
P. L. Shinnie, Meroe: a Civilization of the Sudan,  (Praeger, 1967),

External links

The treasure of the queen (English)
Stela found in Naqa

Date of birth unknown
Place of birth unknown
1st-century BC monarchs of Kush
1st-century monarchs of Kush
1st-century BC women rulers
1st-century women rulers
Queens of Kush
1st-century monarchs in Africa
Ancient queens regnant
AD 1 deaths